Geneve may refer to:

 Genève, French for Geneva, Switzerland
 Generic Network Virtualization Encapsulation